Eric Grove Torkelson (born March 3, 1952 in Troy, New York) is a former American football running back who played seven seasons for the Green Bay Packers of the National Football League from (1974–1979 and 1981).

He was the first football player from Burnt Hills-Ballston Lake High School to reach the National Football League.

References

1952 births
Living people
American football running backs
UConn Huskies football players
Green Bay Packers players